This is a list of national parks in Korea.

National Parks

Republic of Korea (South)

Democratic People's Republic of Korea (North)
Baekdu-san  (Paektusan)
Ch'ilposan
Lake Bujon National Park
Myohyang-san
Geumgang-san  (Kǔmgangsan / the Diamond Mountains)
Guwol-san  (Kuwǒlsan)

External links 
 National Parks of the Republic of Korea

Korea
National parks
Environment of Korea